Horror Stories 3 is a 2016 South Korean film, it is a final sequel of horror omnibus trilogy Horror Stories beginning at 2012. It stars Lee Dae-yeon, Lim Seul-ong, Park Jung-min, Kyung Soo-jin, Hong Eun-hee and the child actress Kim Su-an. it was released on June 3, 2016.

Stories

A Girl from Mars
Plot: A mysterious girl from Mars seeks refuge at a place run by androids. She must explain to them why she is fleeing the humans, and tells some stories about human fear between past, present and future. 
 Directed by : Min Kyu-dong
 Original: DJUNA, Min Kyu-dong.
 Cast: Kim Su-an and Cha Ji-yeon

The Fox Valley
 Directed by: Baek Seung-bin
 Original: DJUNA
 Cast: Lim Seul-ong, Kim Jong-soo,  and

Road Rage
 Diretor: Kim Seon 
 Cast: Park Jung-min, Kyung Soo-jin and Lee Dae-yeon.

Robot Spirit
 Plot: In the near future where high-tech robotic children are purchased as live-in babysitters, an outdated, defective 10-year-old robotic babysitter lives beyond his intended use, until it suffers a technical malfunction and becomes hostile and maniacally obsessive to anyone who comes between him and his family.
 Director: Kim Gok
 Music: Park young-min 
 Cast: Hong Eun-hee, Lee Jae-in and Lomon

References

2016 films
South Korean horror anthology films
2010s Korean-language films
South Korean sequel films
2016 horror films
2010s South Korean films
Films about artificial intelligence
Android (robot) films
Robot films